Déda may refer to:

 Déda, Hungarian name of the village of Deda, Romania
 Déda, Brazilian surname
 Marcelo Déda, Brazilian politician